Roy Samuel Miller (24 December 1924 – 21 August 2014) was a West Indian cricketer who played in one Test in 1953. He was born in Kingston, Jamaica.

A lower-order batsman and opening bowler, Miller played seven matches for Jamaica between 1950–51 and 1953–54, and was selected for the Fourth Test against India in Georgetown in 1952-53, replacing Gerry Gomez. Batting at number eight and trying to score quick runs, he strained his back going for a big hit and was unable to bowl in the Indian second innings. Gomez returned for the Fifth Test. Miller's only first-class score higher than the 23 he made in his one Test innings was 86 for Jamaica against British Guiana in 1952-53, and his best bowling was 3 for 65 against Barbados in 1951-52.

References

External links
 Roy Miller at Cricinfo
 Roy Miller at CricketArchive

1924 births
2014 deaths
Jamaican cricketers
Cricketers from Kingston, Jamaica
West Indies Test cricketers
Jamaican expatriates in the United States